This is a list of Members of Parliament (MPs) elected to the third parliament in the reign of King Charles I in 1628.

The third parliament began on 16 March 1628 and was held to 26 June 1628. The second session of this parliament began at Westminster on 20 January 1629 and was held to 2 March 1629 when it was adjourned to 10 March and then dissolved. Following the dissolution of this parliament, Charles exercised eleven years of Personal Rule without parliament until April 1640 when the Short Parliament was convened.

List of constituencies and members
In 1628 the constituencies of Milborne Port and Weobley were re-enfranchised after the Committee of Privileges investigated abuses where the right of boroughs to return burgesses had fallen into disuse.

See also
List of parliaments of the United Kingdom

Notes

References
D. Brunton & D. H. Pennington, Members of the Long Parliament (London: George Allen & Unwin, 1954)
Cobbett's Parliamentary history of England, from the Norman Conquest in 1066 to the year 1803 (London: Thomas)
Browne Willis Notitia parliamentaria, or, An history of the counties, cities, and boroughs in England and Wales: ... The whole extracted from mss. and printed evidences 1750 pp218

Parliaments of Charles I of England
1628 in England
1628 in politics
1628
 List